Killer Drag Queens on Dope is a 2003 low budget comedy written, produced, and directed by Lazar Saric. The film stars Alexis Arquette (also known as Eva Destruction) and Omar Alexis as two drugged up drag queens who work as contract killers.

Cast
 Eva Destruction as Ginger
 Omar Alexis as Coco
 Clark Weaver as Roy
 Macky Beltzkovsky as Anthony
 Mario Diaz as Bobby
 Don Edmonds as Uncle A
 Don Lucas as Richie
 Haji as Moonji
 Lawrence Hilton-Jacobs as Mr. Fly

External links
 

2003 films
2003 comedy films
American LGBT-related films
American independent films
American comedy films
Drag (clothing)-related films
2000s English-language films
2000s American films